Porúbka is a village and municipality in Humenné District in the Prešov Region of north-east Slovakia.

History
In historical records the village was first mentioned in 1451.

Geography
The municipality lies at an altitude of 310 metres and covers an area of 4.329 km².
It has a population of about 280 people.

External links
 
 http://www.statistics.sk/mosmis/eng/run.html

Villages and municipalities in Humenné District
Zemplín (region)